Inder "Gogi" Singh (25 February 1944 – 19 August 2001) was an Indian hockey player who represented India in the 1968 Summer Olympics.

Nicknamed "Gogi", Singh was born in Faridkot which has produced many players of repute. He received his early education in Balbir High School, Faridkot, an institution which boasted of well-maintained hockey and football grounds. Since hockey was the most popular game, Inder honed his skill under ideal conditions. 
Having gained proficiency in hockey, Inder Singh was offered a job in the Railways. He represented the institution's team in various tournaments of the country. His outstanding performance while playing in the inside-left position was noticed and Inder soon found himself in the national team. In the Mexico Olympics, his performance came in for special mention.

Married to Gianna, an Italian citizen, Inder Singh settled in Italy after relinquishing his job in the Railways. His wife, Gianna, was also a national level hockey player of her country. After emigrating to Italy he played a major role in establishing a hockey club at Bra, a small town in northern Italy, which also had an Astro-Turf. Both Inder and Gianna continued to inspire youngsters with their achievements. Their daughter, Jasbir, followed in their footsteps and has earned a place in the Italian national team. The couple was also blessed with one son, Joginder.

He died of cancer on 19 August 2001.

References

External links
 

1944 births
2001 deaths
People from Faridkot, Punjab
Field hockey players from Punjab, India
Indian male field hockey players
Olympic field hockey players of India
Olympic bronze medalists for India
Olympic medalists in field hockey
Medalists at the 1968 Summer Olympics
Field hockey players at the 1968 Summer Olympics
Asian Games medalists in field hockey
Field hockey players at the 1966 Asian Games
Asian Games gold medalists for India
Medalists at the 1966 Asian Games